Laura Carmine (born Laura Yliana Carmine Miranda; April 2, 1983) is a Puerto Rican actress who currently resides in Mexico.

Early life 
Carmine was born in San Juan, Puerto Rico but soon moved with her family to Mexico. She was born with Heterochromia iridum.

She obtained two degrees, one in Advertising and Marketing. In 2003, she began a master's degree in international marketing, but interrupted her studies in 2006 when she was accepted to Televisa's renowned Center for Artistic Education.

Career 
Carmine began her television career in 2008, in exclusive programs at SKY México.

In 2011, Carmine got her first leading role in Televisa's telenovela, Ni contigo ni sin ti, alongside Eduardo Santamarina.

In 2012, she gave Special participation in Rosy Ocampo's telenovela Por ella soy Eva. Later, she joined the cast of Carlos Moreno's production, Amor bravío. She played her first villain role as Silvia Navarro's sister, Ximena. That same year she got her second leading role in the remake of La usurpadora; ¿Quién Eres Tú?. She played the double role of the twins Natalia and Verónica, alongside Julián Gil.

In 2013, Carmine starred as the main villain in Salvador Mejía Alejandre's La tempestad, alongside William Levy.

In 2014, she appeared in a guest role in De que te quiero, te quiero as Simona.

In 2015, Carmine worked again with Carlos Moreno in A que no me dejas, as Nuria. A role that earned her an TVyNovelas Award for Best Antagonist Actress.

On June 8, 2016, it was confirmed Carmine will be part of the cast of José Alberto Castro's Vino el amor.

Personal life
On February 9, 2016, Carmine confirmed she is in relationship with Adriano Zendejas, who is 13 years younger than her, but after 10 months they broke up.

Filmography

Awards and nominations

Premios TVyNovelas

References

External links 
 

1983 births
Living people
Mexican television actresses
Mexican telenovela actresses
Puerto Rican emigrants to Mexico
Puerto Rican telenovela actresses
Puerto Rican television actresses
21st-century Mexican actresses